Escape Artists is a motion picture and television production company

Escape Artists may also refer to:
Escape Artists (Austrian band)
Escape Artists (Danish band)
Escape Artists, Inc., a podcast production company
Escape Artists Motion Pictures, a producer of Tamil-language films

See also
 Escape artist